Casey Cole, O.F.M., is an American Franciscan friar, Catholic priest, writer, and blogger. Cole runs his own online blog and YouTube channel called Breaking in the Habit and is the author of the books Let Go: Seven Stumbling Blocks to Christian Discipleship and Called: What Happens After Saying Yes to God.

Biography

Early life 
Cole grew up in Lancaster, Pennsylvania, before moving to Cary, North Carolina. He was a parishioner at St. Michael the Archangel Catholic Church in Cary. Cole attended Green Hope High School and, in 2011, graduated from Furman University with a degree in religious studies and a minor in poverty studies.

In August 2011, Cole was received as a postulant in the Order of Friars Minor.

Media career and onward 
Later in 2011, he began his blog called Breaking in the Habit, writing about considering joining the priesthood, later adding a podcast and a YouTube channel.

He was received as a Franciscan novice in August 2012, where, in 2013, he made his first profession with novices from seven North American provinces in Burlington, Wisconsin at the Franciscan Interprovincial Novitiate. He studied at The Catholic University of America from 2013 to 2016, working towards a master of divinity degree. In 2016, Cole began serving at Immaculate Conception Catholic Church in Durham, a Franciscan parish, and professed his final vows as a Franciscan friar in 2017. In March 2018, he was ordained a deacon.

In 2019, he received a master of divinity from Catholic Theological Union in Chicago.

On June 22, 2019, Cole was ordained a priest of the Franciscan Order by Luis R. Zarama, the Bishop of Raleigh, at Immaculate Conception Catholic Church. At Cole's insistence, all lay liturgical ministers who assisted in the celebration of the Mass were women.

Since 2020, Cole has served as the chaplain of Mount de Sales Academy in Macon, Georgia.

Writings
Cole has written two books, Called: What Happens After Saying Yes to God and Let Go: Seven Stumbling Blocks to Christian Discipleship.

References 

Living people
21st-century American Roman Catholic priests
American Friars Minor
American male bloggers
American bloggers
American Roman Catholic religious writers
American TikTokers
American YouTubers
Catholic Theological Union alumni
Furman University alumni
Franciscan writers
People from Cary, North Carolina
People from Lancaster, Pennsylvania
Year of birth missing (living people)